The Dar el-Beida is a royal residence in Fez, Morocco. It was originally part of the same complex as the adjacent Dar Batha to its northeast, but was separated in 1915 as the latter was repurposed as a museum. It remains an official residence today, inaccessible to the public.

History

Dar Batha and Dar el-Beida were constructed to serve as a summer palace and as a residence for distinguished visitors and guests. The complex was commissioned and begun in the late 19th century by Sultan Hassan I. Dar Batha was completed under Sultan Abdelaziz, while Dar el-Beida was completed under his rival and successor Abdelhafid.

In 1912 the two palaces were used to house the services of the Resident-general of the new French Protectorate. In 1915, Dar Batha was converted into a museum of local arts, to which the collection previously housed at the Dar Adiyel was transferred. The Dar el-Beida continues to be used by the government as a reception palace.

Architecture

The Dar el-Beida is no longer connected to Dar Batha today. Its grounds, entered via a monumental and ornate gate to the southwest, are filled with large gardens dotted with pavilions, and a main palace in the northeast area with more interior gardens and ornate courtyards. One of the canals derived from the Oued Fes (Fes River) passes through the gardens and the palace.

See also
 Royal Palace of Fez
 List of Moroccan royal residences

Notes

Palaces in Fez, Morocco
'Alawi architecture
Royal residences in Morocco